The Junín grebe (Podiceps taczanowskii), also known as Junin flightless grebe or puna grebe, is a grebe found only on Lake Junin in the highlands of Junín, west-central Peru. The grebe generally breeds in bays and channels around the edge of the Lake, within  of reed beds, entering the reeds only for nesting or roosting. When not breeding, Junin grebe prefer open water, moving far out from lake shores. The current population is estimated at less than 250.

The scientific name commemorates the Polish zoologist Władysław Taczanowski, author of Ornithology of Peru (1884–86).

Another highly endangered species, the Junin rail, is restricted to the same lake.

Description 

With a size of approximately 35 cm, the Junin grebe has a dark grey crown extending down the back of its neck to a black back. It has white lower parts of the face, neck and underparts, with a narrow grey bill. Perhaps the most striking feature is its bright red eyes. On the side of the head of adults there are silvery grey feathers, which are absent on non-breeding adults and juveniles.

Its calls include melodic whistles doo’ ith, wit, and a longer phooee-th when trying to attract a mate.

Behaviour and ecology

Breeding 
Courtship involves two grebes facing breast to breast and turning their head quickly from side to side, called ‘head-shaking’. The nests of Junin grebes are built in reed beds around the border of Lake Junin, and a typical clutch size is two eggs, laid in December or January. In years when the water level of the lake is particularly low, no young are raised.

Feeding 
The Junin grebe's exceptional diving skills allows it to feed on small fish and invertebrates. They can be often seen feeding and diving simultaneously in small groups.

Distribution and habitat 
Junin grebes are endemic to Lake Junin, in west-central Peru. The lake covers approximately 140 km2 and at its deepest is 10m deep, although most of the lake is less than 5m deep. Around the borders of the lake are substantial reed marshes, where the grebes nest and roost.

Status 
Lake Junin has been classed as a national reserve since 1974, which has restricted the amount of fishing and hunting that can take place there. More recently, in 2002, the Peruvian government made an emergency law to place harsher restrictions on water extraction and provisions for cleaning of the lake, but so far this has not been properly enforced. Attempts have been made to translocate the grebes to a lake just north of Lake Junin, however gill nets used to catch rainbow trout in this lake meant it was unsuccessful. Further studies are being carried out to locate other lakes that the Junin grebe could successfully be translocated to.

Large fluctuations in water levels, caused by a nearby hydroelectric plant, and water pollution from mining activities have caused the population of grebes to fall from 1000 in 1961 to around 200 in 2007. Contamination of the lake from mining waste products kills the small fish that are the Junin grebes main source of food. The hydroelectric plant can cause the water level to drop below 5m, which prevents the birds from raising chicks, and can cause damage to the bordering reed marshes.

A local organisation, Asociaciόn Ecosistemas Andinos, is working to educate local people about the Junin grebe and the Junin rail – which is also endemic to the lake. The aim is to raise awareness of the issue, and get the mining and hydroelectric plant organisations to understand the issue.

References

External links

 
 
 
 
 
 

Junín grebe
Flightless birds
Junín grebe
Birds of the Altiplano
Endemic birds of Peru
Critically endangered animals
Critically endangered biota of South America
Junín grebe
Junín grebe
Junín grebe